The Design 1032 ship (full name Emergency Fleet Corporation Design 1032) was a steel-hulled tanker ship design approved for production by the United States Shipping Boards Emergency Fleet Corporation (EFT) in World War I. A total of 5 ships were ordered and completed from 1919 to 1920. All ships were constructed by Bethlehem San Francisco, but sources disagree whether all were built in Alameda or some were also built in the Union Iron Works yard.

References

Bibliography

External links
 EFC Design 1032: Illustrations

Standard ship types of the United States
Design 1032 ships
Design 1032 ships of the United States Navy